Victoria Chernova is a paralympic athlete from Russia competing mainly in category T12 middle-distance events.

Victoria competed in the 2000 Summer Paralympics where she won bronze medals in both the 800m and 5000m as well as competing in the 1500m

References

Paralympic athletes of Russia
Athletes (track and field) at the 2000 Summer Paralympics
Paralympic bronze medalists for Russia
Living people
Medalists at the 2000 Summer Paralympics
Year of birth missing (living people)
Paralympic medalists in athletics (track and field)
Russian female middle-distance runners
20th-century Russian women
21st-century Russian women
Visually impaired middle-distance runners
Paralympic middle-distance runners